The Ben Elton Show is a British comedy series, which aired on BBC in 1998. It was a comedy-variety show, which proved a surprise, since Elton had despised the format as much as The Two Ronnies. However, this didn't avoid him from getting Ronnie Corbett to do his classic "armchair monologues", although these became much racier. The show was criticised for Elton's departure from the social commentary he was known for, and the show was cancelled after its initial series.

References

External links
 

1998 British television series debuts
1998 British television series endings
1990s British comedy television series
English-language television shows
BBC television comedy